Chris Beard may refer to:

Chris Beard (executive), Canadian businessman and former CEO at Mozilla
Chris Beard (singer) (born 1957), American singer-songwriter
Chris Beard (basketball) (born 1973), American basketball coach
K. Christopher Beard, curator of vertebrate paleontology at the Carnegie Museum of Natural History
Chris Beard, writer of 1960s Canadian satirical TV series Nightcap
Chris Beard, British guitarist, former member of Blitzkrieg